Duff Roblin Provincial Park was designated a provincial park by the Government of Manitoba in 2008. The park is considered to be a Class V protected area under the IUCN protected area management categories.

See also
List of protected areas of Manitoba
Dufferin Roblin

References

Provincial parks of Manitoba
Protected areas of Manitoba